Migration, migratory, or migrate may refer to:

Human migration
 Human migration, physical movement by humans from one region to another
 International migration, when peoples cross state boundaries and stay in the host state for some minimum length of time

Natural sciences

Biology
 Migration (ecology), the large-scale movement of species from one environment to another
 Animal migration
 Bird migration
 Plant migration, see Seed dispersal, the movement or transport of seeds away from the parent plant
 Gene migration, a process in evolution and population genetics
 Cell migration, a process in the development and maintenance of multicellular organisms
 Collective cell migration, describing the movements of group of cells

Physics and chemistry
 Molecular diffusion, in physics
 Migration (chemistry), type of reaction in organic chemistry
 Seismic migration, in seismic and ground penetrating radar data processing
 Microscopic motion of material caused by an external force, distinct from spontaneous diffusion, including drift current, electrophoresis, electromigration, thermodiffusion, sedimentation, in physical chemistry and materials
 Planetary migration, the alteration of the satellite's orbital parameters

Information technology
 Migration (virtualization), the process by which a running virtual machine is moved from one physical host to another
 Content migration, the process of moving information to a new system
 Data migration, the process of transferring data between storage types, formats, or computer systems
 PC migration, the process of transferring the entire user environment between two computer systems
 Schema migration, the management of incremental, reversible changes to relational database schemas
 Software migration, the conversion, rewriting or porting of a legacy system to a modern computer system
 System migration, the tasks involved when moving data and applications from current hardware to new hardware

Arts and media

Music
 "Migrate" (song), a 2008 song from Mariah Carey's album E=MC²
 Migration (The Amboy Dukes album)
 Migration (Antonio Sánchez album), a 2007 album by Antonio Sánchez
 Migration (Bonobo album), 2017 album by Bonobo
 Migration (Creative Source album), the second album by Los Angeles, California-based R&B group Creative Source
 Migration (Dave Grusin album)
 The Migration, album by Scale the Summit
 Migrations (album), a 2006 album by The Duhks

Other media
 Migrations, a 2000 photo essay and book by Sebastião Salgado
 Migrations, 1929 novel by Miloš Crnjanski
 Migrations (film), a 1988 Yugoslav film based on the novel
 Migrations, by Karim Alrawi, a stage play and winner of the John Whiting Award
 Migration (film), a 2014 animated film by Mark Lomond and Johanne Ste-Marie
 Migration, an upcoming film from Illumination Entertainment

Other uses
 Piercing migration, in body modification, a process that occurs when a body piercing moves from its initial location

See also
 Immigration
 Emigration
 Migrant (disambiguation)
 Great Migration (disambiguation)
 Migration period, a period in European history that saw the fall of the Western Roman Empire and large-scale migrations